Tyatya (also spelled Tiatia and known as Chachadake (爺爺岳) in Japanese) is a volcano located in the northeastern part of Kunashir Island, Kuril Islands, Russia. Tyatya is one of the finest examples anywhere in the world of a somma volcano, a stratovolcano whose summit has collapsed to form a caldera which has then been mostly refilled by a new, younger volcanic cone which rises above the caldera rim.

See also
 List of volcanoes in Russia
 List of ultras of Northeast Asia

References

External links

 Chachadake (Tiatia): Global Volcanism Program - Smithsonian Institution
 Chachadake - Japan Meteorological Agency 
  - Japan Meteorological Agency
 Chacha Dake (Tyatya) - Geological Survey of Japan

Kunashir Island
Stratovolcanoes of Russia
Active volcanoes